The Nongye Expressway is a  long elevated expressway in Zhengzhou, Henan, China.

History
The construction of the expressway commenced on 1 March 2015. It is constructed in three phases: the east section (Zhongyi West Road–Nanyang Road) was opened on 26 January 2016. the west section (Tongbai N. Road–western terminus) was opened on 8 January 2017, and the section between Tongbai N. Road and Nanyang Road, which includes a bridge above Zhengzhou North railway station, was completed and opened for traffic on 31 March 2019.

Route
The expressway starts at the crossing of Nongye E Road and Zhongyi W. Road in the east. It is then elevated above Nongye E. Road, Nongye Road, Rantun Road, and Huagong Road from east to west.

Exit list

From east to west:

References

Expressways in Henan
Transport in Henan
Expressways in Zhengzhou